Madras Mahajana Sabha was an Indian nationalist organisation based in the Madras Presidency. Along with the Poona Sarvajanik Sabha, Bombay Presidency Association and the Indian Association, it is considered to be a predecessor of the Indian National Congress. Madras mahajana sabha was formed in 1884.

Origin 
The first organisation in the Madras Presidency to agitate for the rights of Indians was the Madras Native Association which was established by publicist Gazulu Lakshminarasu Chetty in 1852. This organisation did not survive for long and was eventually disbanded.

In May 1884, M. Veeraraghavachariar, G. Subramania Iyer and P. Anandacharlu established the Madras Mahajana Sabha. The office of the Sabha functioned in the beginning at the office of The Hindu, Ellis Road Junction, Mount Road. P. Rangaiah Naidu was elected President of the Sabha in 1885. In September 1885, the Sabha in collaboration with the Bombay Presidency Association and the Indian Association, sent a delegation to England.

The Mahajana Sabha held its first conference between 29 December 1884 and 2 January 1885. The Sabha adopted a moderate policy in its early days. However, still, its aims and objectives were considered seditious. In December 1895, on his visit to Madras, the Viceroy of India, Lord Elgin refused to receive the welcome address from the Madras Mahajana Sabha.

History 

The member’s of the Mahajan Sabha felt the necessity of creating an organization at All India level to relieve and free the nation from the clutches of British rule and solve the problems of Indians. The members of the sabha expressed the idea very strongly in the conference held at Adayar Theosophical Society which was attended by many patriots and leaders, who materialized it later by forming The Indian National Congress later. Madras Mahajana Sabha was considered to be a unique organization which has paved the way for India's national freedom by the South Indians. Thus the Sabha has voiced out the fundamental rights of Indians such as national freedom and other common social issues for the welfare of our fellowmen since 1884. It has developed a very close relationship with the Indian National Congress and its activities since 1920 onwards.

Consequently in 1930, the Sabha organized the Salt Satyagraha movement on 22 April in Madras George Town, Esplanade, High Court and Beach areas. The members of the Sabha were attacked savagely by the British police and shed their blood for the national cause. As the Sabha insisted on a legal enquiry about the injustice done towards the participants of the Satyagraha, a three-man commission under the leadership of Justice T.R Ramachandra Iyer enquired thirty people and submitted its report to the government.

When a similar attack was repeated on 27 April in the Public Meeting of Bal Gangadhar Tilak, at Pycrofts Road by the British Police, advocate Sri Govindasamy was killed as the police opened fire. Again it was the Madras Mahajana Sabha which took strong steps to set up an enquiry commission about the murder of Sri Govindasamy and Diwan Bahdur Sri R. N. Arogyasamy Mudaliar headed the commission that brought out the truth to the World. Once again in 1942, many members of the Sabha took part in the Quit India Movement and were imprisoned.

When the British government banned the Congress Party, Madras Mahajana Sabha conducted numerous exhibitions to instigate the patriotic feelings in the hearts of their countrymen such as All India Khadi Exhibition and Swadeshi Exhibition.

The father of the nation, Mahatma Gandhi, delivered a speech at the meeting of Mahajana Sabha on 24 October 1896. Pandit Jawaharlal Nehru also participated in the Golden Jubilee Celebrations of the Sabha.

The Diamond Jubilee Celebrations of the Madras Mahajana Sabha were held on 31 January 1945.

It has the daily copies of The Hindu Newspaper since 1932. They were donated to the Hindu Library in 2001. The library possesses all type of books on History, Science, Biographies of leaders, particulars about the world countries etc. apart from the renderings of popular writers.

In addition, the Sabha ran a nursery school in the name of Sri Kamarajar for the children of the very poor and downtrodden people like rickshaw drivers, scavengers and labourers until 1996.

The Sabha’s Executive Committee members met Khan Abdul Ghaffar Khan (frontier Gandhi) at Raj Bhavan, Madras on 31.12.1969.

Hindi was taught freely in the evenings at the Sabha, which was functioning behind the LIC building, Anna Salai till 1990. The government and private authorities who learned here benefitted from this service.

From 1980 to 2001, the Sabha met great financial assistance for its administration. The then administrators like P.G. Nataraja Mudaliar, Myilai M.P. Gnanasundram, K.Ramanathan and C.T. Shanmugam have rendered great service and assistance for the functioning of the Sabha during this period. Their services during this period is remarkable and praiseworthy. 

The centennial year celebrations of the Sabha were conducted in the year 1985. Many leaders with historical importance took part in its various events. The Sabha has awarded mementos to Fifty Thyagies on this occasion.

Madras Mahajana Sabha celebrated its 125th year in 2010.

References 

Indian independence movement in Tamil Nadu
Organizations established in 1874
Organisations based in Chennai
1874 establishments in India